Koloonella turrita, common name the turret pyramid-shell,  is a species of sea snail, a marine gastropod mollusk in the family Murchisonellidae, the pyrams and their allies.

Distribution
This marine species occurs off Eastern Australia, New South Wales, Victoria, Australia, Western Australia, the Bass Strait and Tasmania.

References

 Hedley, C. (1916). A preliminary index of the Mollusca of Western Australia. Journal and Proceedings of the Royal Society of Western Australia. 1 : 152-226
 Cotton, B.C. & Godfrey, F.K. (1932). South Australian Shells. Part 6. South Australian Naturalist. 14 (1): 16-44
 Iredale, T. & McMichael, D.F. (1962). A reference list of the marine Mollusca of New South Wales. Memoirs of the Australian Museum. 11 : 1-109
 Macpherson, J.H. & Gabriel, C.J. (1962). Marine Mollusca of Victoria. Melbourne : Melbourne Univ. Press. 475 pp.

External links
 To World Register of Marine Species
  Simon Grove: A guide to the seashells and other marine moilluscs of Tasmania : Koloonella turrita

Murchisonellidae
Gastropods described in 1884